Toolamba is a closed railway station on the Goulburn Valley railway in the town of Toolamba, Victoria, Australia. The station opened as a junction at the same time as the railway from Mangalore to Shepparton on 13 January 1880, with the line to Tatura opening on the same day. The last passenger service to the station from Echuca ran on 2 March 1981 with Y class diesel locomotive Y161 an ABE carriage and a C van. This consist had only been introduced a few months prior, with a DERM usually being rostered. Toolamba finally closed as a station on 20 December 1987.

The platform was on the west side of the line, with a dirt mound and the foundations of the signal box remaining today. A water tower is located at the Seymour end of the station, and a 725 metre long loop siding is located across from the former platform, which is usable as a crossing loop. The junction for the line to Echuca faces Seymour, and is located on the Shepparton end of the level crossing.

References

Disused railway stations in Victoria (Australia)